The açaí palm (from Nheengatu asai), Euterpe oleracea, is a species of palm tree (Arecaceae) cultivated for its fruit (açaí berries, or simply açaí), hearts of palm (a vegetable), fronds, and trunk wood. Global demand for the fruit has expanded rapidly in the 21st century, and the tree is cultivated for that purpose primarily.

The species is native to eastern Amazonia, especially in Brazil, mainly in swamps and floodplains. The fruit is small, round, and black-purple in color. The fruit became a staple food in floodplain areas around the 18th century, but its consumption in urban areas and promotion as a health food only began in the mid 1990s along with the popularization of other Amazonian fruits outside the region.

Name 
The common name comes from the Portuguese adaptation of the Tupian word , meaning "[fruit that] cries or expels water". The importance of the fruit as a staple food in the Amazon River delta gives rise to the local legend of how the plant got its name. The folklore says that chief Itaqui ordered all newborns put to death owing to a period of famine. When his own daughter gave birth and the child was sacrificed, she cried and died beneath a newly sprouted tree. The tree fed the tribe and was called açaí because that was the daughter's name (Iaçá) spelled backwards.

Fruit

The exocarp of the ripe fruits is a deep purple color, or green, depending on the kind of açaí and its maturity. The seed makes up about 60-80% of the fruit. The palm bears fruit year round but the berry cannot be harvested during the rainy season.

Cultivation
There are two harvests: one is normally between January and June, while the other is between August and December. The last harvest is the most important.

Cultivars 
Few named cultivars exist, and varieties differ mostly in the nature of the fruit:

'Branco' ("White") is a rare variety local to the Amazon estuary in which the berries do not change color, but remain green when ripe. This is believed to be due to a recessive gene since only about 30% of 'Branco' palm seeds mature to express this trait.
'BRS-Pará' was developed in 2004 by the Brazilian Agricultural Research Agency. The pulp yield ranges from 15% to 25%.
'BRS Pai d'Égua' is the newest cultivar developed by the Brazilian Agricultural Research Agency.

Nutritional content

A powdered preparation of freeze-dried açaí fruit pulp and skin was reported to contain (per 100 g of dry powder) 534 calories, 52 g carbohydrates, 8 g protein, and 33 g total fat. The carbohydrate portion included 44 g of dietary fiber with low sugar levels, and the fat portion consisted of oleic acid (56% of total fats), palmitic acid (24%), and linoleic acid (13%). The powder was also shown to contain (per 100 g) negligible vitamin C, 260 mg calcium, 4 mg iron, and 1002 IU vitamin A.

Polyphenols 
A comparative analysis from  studies reported that açaí has intermediate polyphenol content relative to 11 varieties of frozen juice pulps, scoring lower than acerola, mango, strawberry, and grapes. The extent to which polyphenols as dietary antioxidants may promote health is unknown, as no credible evidence indicates any antioxidant role for polyphenols in vivo.

When three commercially available juice mixes, containing unspecified percentages of açaí juice, were compared for in vitro antioxidant capacity against red wine, tea, six types of pure fruit juice, and pomegranate juice, the average antioxidant capacity ranked lower than that of pomegranate juice, Concord grape juice, blueberry juice, and red wine. The average was roughly equivalent to that of black cherry or cranberry juice, and was higher than that of orange juice, apple juice, and tea.

The medical watchdog website Quackwatch said that "açaí juice has only middling levels of antioxidants – less than that of Concord grape, blueberry, and black cherry juices, but more than cranberry, orange, and apple juices."

The anthocyanins of açaí likely have relevance to antioxidant capacity only in the plant's natural defense mechanisms, and in vitro. Anthocyanins in açaí accounted for only about 10% of the overall antioxidant capacity in vitro. The Linus Pauling Institute and European Food Safety Authority state that "the relative contribution of dietary flavonoids to (...) antioxidant function in vivo is likely to be very small or negligible". But unlike controlled test tube conditions, in vivo anthocyanins have been shown to be poorly conserved (less than 5%), and most of what is absorbed exists as chemically modified metabolites destined for rapid excretion.

A powdered preparation of freeze-dried açaí fruit pulp and skin was shown to contain cyanidin 3-O-glucoside and cyanidin 3-O-rutinoside as major anthocyanins (3.19 mg/g). The powdered preparation was also reported to contain twelve flavonoid-like compounds, including homoorientin, orientin, taxifolin deoxyhexose, isovitexin, scoparin, as well as proanthocyanidins (12.89 mg/g), and low levels of resveratrol (1.1 μg/g).

Marketing
In the 1980s, the Brazilian Gracie family marketed açaí as an energy drink or as crushed fruit served with granola and bananas; this demand led to the building of cottage industries and processing plants to pulp and freeze açaí for export.

Scams 
In the early 2000s, numerous companies flooded the internet with açaí advertising, many of them with counterfeit testimonials and products. In 2009, açaí scams were ranked #1 on the US FTC's "scams and rip-offs" list, so that by 2011 sales of açaí flattened as the fad waned.

Açaí was promoted heavily for its antioxidants, and many false claims were made, including a reversal of diabetes and other chronic illnesses, as well as expanding the size of the penis and increasing men's sexual virility. According to the Washington, D.C.-based Center for Science in the Public Interest thousands of consumers had trouble stopping recurrent charges on their credit cards when they canceled free trials of some açai-based products. In 2003, American celebrity doctor Nicholas Perricone included açaí berries among "superfoods", but such extravagant marketing claims regarding açaí as miracle cures for everything from obesity to attention-deficit disorder were challenged in subsequent studies. Even some websites purporting to warn about açai-related scams are themselves perpetrating scams.

By 2011, Ralph Carson, the formulator of MonaVie, cautioned the public that the product was in fact nothing more than "expensive flavored water" and that any claims made about it were "purely hypothetical, unsubstantiated and, quite frankly, bogus".

The FTC handed down an $80 million judgement in January 2012 against five companies that were marketing açaí berry supplements with fraudulent claims that their products promoted weight loss and prevented colon cancer. One company, Central Coast Nutraceuticals, was ordered to pay a $1.5 million settlement.

Production

Brazil is a major producer, particularly in the state of Pará, which alone in 2019 produced more than 1.2 million tons of açaí, an amount equal to 95% of Brazil's total.

Uses

As a food product 
Fresh açaí has been consumed as a dietary staple in the region around the Amazon river delta for centuries. The fruit is processed into pulp for supply to food product manufacturers or retailers, sold as frozen pulp, juice, or an ingredient in various products from beverages, including grain alcohol, smoothies, foods, cosmetics and supplements.

In a study of three traditional Caboclo populations in the Brazilian Amazon, açaí palm was described as the most important plant species because the fruit makes up a major component of their diet, up to 42% of the total food intake by weight.

In North America, açaí is commonly sold in "açaí bowls", a combination of frozen açaí puree or açaí powder with other ingredients, such as nut milk, fruit juice, fruit, nuts, oatmeal, and sweeteners. Açaí bowls may contain more than 50 g of sugar (the equivalent of 12 teaspoons), or double what the American Heart Association recommends for an entire day, and have been described by nutritionists as a "sugar bomb",  "glorified dessert" or "occasional treat", more akin to eating a bowl of ice cream than a meal.

Dietary supplement 

As of 2015, there are no scientifically controlled studies providing proof of any health benefits from consuming açaí. No açaí products have been evaluated by the FDA, and their efficacy is doubtful. Specifically, there is no scientific evidence that açaí consumption affects body weight, promotes weight loss or has any positive health effect.

Açaí oil 

The oil is suitable for cooking or as a salad dressing, but is mainly used in cosmetics as shampoos, soaps or skin moisturizers.

The oil compartments in açaí fruit contain polyphenols such as procyanidin oligomers and vanillic acid, syringic acid, p-hydroxybenzoic acid, protocatechuic acid, and ferulic acid, which were shown to degrade substantially during storage or exposure to heat. Although these compounds are under study for potential health effects, there remains no substantial evidence that açaí polyphenols have any effect in humans. Açaí oil is green in color, has a bland aroma, and is high in oleic and palmitic fatty acids.

Other uses
Leaves of the palm may be made into hats, mats, baskets, brooms and roof thatch for homes, and trunk wood, resistant to pests, for building construction. Tree trunks may be processed to yield dietary minerals.

Comprising 80% of the fruit mass, açaí seeds may be ground for livestock food or as a component of organic soil for plants. Planted seeds are used for new palm tree stock, which, under the right growing conditions, can require months to form seedlings. Seeds may become waste in landfills or used as fuel for producing bricks.

Research
Orally administered açaí has been tested as a contrast agent for magnetic resonance imaging (MRI) of the gastrointestinal system. Its anthocyanins have also been characterized for stability as a natural food coloring agent.

Gallery

See also 
Açaí bowl
Açaí oil
Euterpe edulis
Euterpe precatoria
Enforcement actions against açaí berry supplement manufacturers

References

Further reading

External links

Pictures of açaí palms trees and fruit from an article by The Nature Conservancy.
Acai 'super-fruit' not so great. Public Radio International

Euterpe (plant)
Trees of South America
Trees of Trinidad and Tobago
Plants described in 1824
Açaí
Edible palms
Crops originating from Brazil
Drupes
Fruits originating in South America